Rabi-ollah Kabiri (1889 in Maragheh – 1947) was an Iranian Azerbaijani general and politician. In 1945, he became Road, Post and Telegraph Minister of Azerbaijan People's Government of  northern Iran in a cabinet led by Ja'far Pishevari.

Notes

References
 *

People from Maragheh
1889 births
1947 deaths
Azerbaijani Democratic Party politicians
Executed politicians
People executed by Pahlavi Iran